Paattali Makkal Katchi (PMK) is a political party in Tamil Nadu, India, founded by S. Ramadoss in 1989 for the Vanniyars, a caste in northern Tamil Nadu. It is currently part of the BJP led National Democratic Alliance (NDA). It contests the elections with the 'Ripe Mango' symbol.
The party is known for its occasional involvement in riots and vandalism. Former CM of Tamil Nadu, Jayalalitha likened the party to a terrorist organisation and threatened with ban for its frequent involvement in violence and vandalism of public property

History

Vanniyar Sangam
The Vanniyar Sangam is PMK's parent organisation. In the 1980s, the Vanniyar Sangham organized the 1987 Vanniyar reservation agitation demanding MBC status for Vanniyars. At the peak of the protests, the state was paralysed for a week when lakhs of trees were felled, highways blocked and damaged and more than 1400 houses of the Dalit community burned down. The police under the M G Ramchandran (MGR) led AIADMK government shot down 21 protestors. Later in 1989, the DMK government under M. Karunanidhi granted them 20 percent reservation under the Most backward class.

PMK (1989–present)
The Pattali Makkal Katchi, founded by S. Ramadoss on 16 July 1989, emerged from the Vanniyar reservation protests.

Ahead of the 2004 elections, PMK joined the Democratic Progressive Alliance, a broad Tamil political front which also included the Dravida Munnetra Kazhagam (DMK), Indian National Congress (INC),  Communist Party of India, Communist Party of India (Marxist) and Indian Union Muslim League. PMK was able to obtain a significant share of power both in the regional government in Tamil Nadu and the Central Government due to a significant number of seats they obtained which helped the United Progressive Alliance ( UPA-I ) to form the Government.

Following the 2004 Lok Sabha elections, the PMK joined the United Progressive Alliance led by the INC. In June 2008, during the final months of the bitter relationship between the DMK and the PMK, the ruling DMK in Tamil Nadu severed its ties with the PMK, an outside supporter of the Karunanidhi Government. However, the DMK did not press for the party's removal from the UPA Government at the centre. On 26 March  2009, PMK declared that, it would join the All India Anna Dravida Munnetra Kazhagam ( AIADMK ) led front and left the United Progressive Alliance (UPA).

S Ramadoss and his son Anbumani Ramdoss were arrested by the Jayalalithaa government for their inflammatory speeches, the PMK cadres indulged in violence in April 2013 causing property damages estimated worth ₹600 crores. Jayalalitha likened the party to a “terrorist” organization and claimed they hurled petrol bombs on moving vehicles and caused damages to 850 vehicles including public buses. Jayalalithaa also threatened to ban the party. Ramadoss and his son were released after 12 days in prison.

PMK contested in the 2014 Lok Sabha election in an alliance with Bharatiya Janata Party led NDA and its candidate Anbumani Ramadoss won from Dharmapuri Lok Sabha constituency, where he was one of two non-AIADMK MPs from Tamil Nadu the other being from its ally BJP.

PMK continued its alliance with AIADMK and BJP in the 2019 Indian general election in Tamil Nadu.

The Madras Institute of Developmental Studies (MIDS) and an reported that the PMK and the Hindu Munnani was involved in the 2019 Ponparappi violence where Dalit women were sexually abused and Dalit houses were attacked and damaged. An NGO Evidence also blamed PMK in the violence because the Dalit colony voted overwhelmingly for VCK.

Ramadoss in November 2020 called for a protest demanding 20% sub-quota for Vanniyars in education and jobs from December 1. Following this, more than 500 angry PMK cadres pelted stones on a moving train and blocked traffic when they were blocked from entering Chennai. A bill to create the 10.5% internal reservation to Vanniyars was passed on February 26, 2021, by the AIADMK government. The move was taken ahead of the April 6 assembly elections to appease the PMK, which had threatened to quit the coalition if their demand were not satisfied. In July 2021, the DMK government issued an order to implement 10.5% quota Bill for Vanniyars.

PMK contested in 23 seats in the AIADMK alliance in the 2021 Tamil Nadu Legislative Assembly election and won five seats by securing 4.04 per cent. In the assembly, PMK voted in favour of anti-CAA and anti-farm-law resolutions, but AIADMK and BJP walked out over the matter. PMK left AIADMK-led alliance for the 2021 local body polls.

Ideology and political positions 
The PMK defied Tamil Nadu's Dravidian political culture by explicitly appealing to its caste identification when asking for support. The party has been linked to direct action and protests that have resulted in violence. Between 2012 and 2013, the party ran a campaign against intercaste marriages.

Leaders 
The leaders of Pattali Makkal Katchi, who are also the national executives of the party are listed below:

Former ministers  

1) Dalit Ezhilmalai - Former central health and family welfare minister (1998-1999)

2) A.k.Moorthy - Former central railway minister (2002-2004)

3) Ponnusamy - Former central petroleum minister (1999-2001)

4) N.T.Shanmugam - Former central Health and family welfare (1999-2000) Former central coal minister(2000-2001) and Former central food processing industries minister(2002-2004)

5) R.Velu - Former central railway minister (2004-2009)

6) Dr.R.Anbumani ramadoss - Former central health and family welfare minister (2004-2009)

Election history

Tamilnadu 

DPA - Democratic Progressive Alliance   NDA - National Democratic Alliance
TF - Third Front  PT - PMK-Tiwari Congress Front

Puducherry 

DPA - Democratic Progressive Alliance   NDA - National Democratic Alliance
TF - Third Front  PT - PMK-Tiwari Congress Front

Lok Sabha Members

Rajya Sabha Members

References 

 
Political parties in Tamil Nadu
Political parties established in 1989
1989 establishments in Tamil Nadu